Pileanthus limacis, commonly known as coastal coppercups, is a plant species of the family Myrtaceae endemic to Western Australia.

It blooms between July and October producing white-pinkflowers.

It is found on coastal sand dunes in the Gascoyne and Pilbara regions of Western Australia between Shark Bay and Ashburton where it grows in sandy soils over limestone.

The species was first formally described by the botanist Jacques Labillardière in 1806 in the work Novae Hollandiae Plantarum Specimen.

References

limacis
Endemic flora of Western Australia
Myrtales of Australia
Rosids of Western Australia
Plants described in 1806
Taxa named by Jacques Labillardière